The 2009 Tuvalu A-Division was the ninth season of association football competition. The league was won by Nauti FC for the third consecutive time and the fourth time overall. The league was renamed for the fourth consecutive season, this time being called the Funafuti League.

Participating teams
 Amatuku FC
 Lakena United
 Lakena United
 Nauti FC
 Nukufetau FC
 Funafuti FC

References

Tuvalu A-Division seasons
Tuvalu
football